Demir Gökgöl (15 July 1937 – 22 March 2012) was a Turkish-German actor.

He was born in Istanbul in 1937. He emigrated to Germany in 1968. He died in Hamburg in 2012; he had been in therapy for throat cancer for several years.

Filmography

Television

References

External links

1937 births
2012 deaths
Turkish emigrants to Germany
German male film actors
German male television actors
Turkish male film actors
Turkish male television actors